Cockatoo and Lapwing is a 1920 German silent film directed by Erich Schönfelder and starring Ossi Oswalda, Victor Janson, and Marga Köhler.

Cast
Ossi Oswalda as Ossi Schönbeck
Hans Brockmann as Hans Reimers, Doctor of Zoology
Marga Köhler as Frau Sturm
Victor Janson as Schlappi Mappi, Boxer
Rudolf Senius as Theodor Stänker, Editor of The Lie
Willi Allen as Fritz, Girls for Everything
Hans Junkermann as Idi Ot, Hysteria painter

References

External links

1920 comedy films
German comedy films
Films of the Weimar Republic
Films directed by Erich Schönfelder
German silent feature films
UFA GmbH films
German black-and-white films
Silent comedy films
1920s German films
1920s German-language films